Virtual Woman is a software program that has elements of a chatbot, virtual reality, artificial intelligence, a video game, and a virtual human. It claims to be the oldest form of virtual life in existence, as it has been distributed since the late 1980s. Recent releases of the program can update their intelligence by connecting online and downloading newer personalities and histories.

Program play

When Virtual Woman starts, the user is presented with a list of options and then may choose their Virtual Woman's ethnic type, personality, location, clothing, etc. or load a pre-built Virtual Woman from a Digital DNA file. Once the options are determined, the user is presented with a 3-D animated Virtual Woman of their selection and then can engage them in conversation, progressing in a manner similar to that of its predecessor, ELIZA and its successors, the chatbots. In most versions of Virtual Woman, this is done through the keyboard, but some versions also support voice input.

In popular culture

Virtual Woman's current publishing company, CyberPunk Software, claims that over one and a half million copies of Virtual Woman are in existence. Software sales and usage statistics from private companies are difficult to verify. WinSite, an independent Internet shareware distribution site that does publish public download counts, has for some time now listed some version of Virtual Woman in their top three shareware downloads of all time with well over seven hundred thousand downloads. 

The Washington Post reported on April 6, 2007 that two bank security guards who had been distracted from their duties by playing Virtual Woman and then tried to cover up the fact that they allowed US$52,000 to be stolen. The bank manager refused to say whether they would be fired, but did say, "I don't think they are getting promoted."

Compadre

The group of beta testers and advisers for Virtual Woman are referred to as Compadre and have their own beta testing site and forum.

Criticisms
As Virtual Woman has developed the ability to conduct longer and more realistic interactions, particularly in recent beta releases, criticism has arisen that this may lead some users to social isolation, or to use the program as a substitute for real human interaction. However, these are criticisms that have been leveled at all video games and at the use of the Internet itself. A company representative, Nancy, indirectly responded to such accusations in an interview with ABC News reporter Mike Martinez in 1998 by stating that Virtual Woman played a valuable role by allowing some form of social interactions for people who may not normally be able to take part in them. 
She cited a user who wrote to thank them because the program had relieved his boredom and isolation while he was recovering from a crippling accident in the hospital.

Release history

Versions of Virtual Woman with rough release dates and PC platforms for which they were designed:
Virtual Woman (????) (DOS)
Virtual Woman for Windows (1991) (Windows 3.0)
Virtual Woman 95 (1995) (Windows 3X, Windows 95)
Virtual Woman 98 (1998) (Windows 3X, Windows 95)
Virtual Woman 2000 (2000) (Windows 95+)
Virtual Woman Millennium (Windows 95, XP)
Virtual Woman Net ( Windows XP/Vista specific)

Notes

External links
 Virtual Woman Official Website

Role-playing video games
Chatbots